Grotella pyronaea is a moth in the genus Grotella, of the family Noctuidae. It was first described by Herbert Druce in 1895. This species is found in North America, including Guerrero, Mexico, its type location.

References

Grotella
Moths described in 1895